T. C. Jasper High School (also known as Jasper or JHS) is a public co-educational secondary school in Plano, Texas (USA) serving grades nine and ten. Founded in 1996, the school is part of the Plano Independent School District. Robinson Middle School and Rice Middle School feed into Jasper. Students leaving Jasper will attend Plano West Senior High School. The school colors are green, black, and white, and the school mascot is the Jaguar.

In 2009, the school was rated "exemplary" by the Texas Education Agency.

History
Jasper was the third school built on the  parcel of land shared with Gulledge Elementary School and Robinson Middle School. 
The company estimates that the construction cost was US$17,000,000. Jasper was the newest of the five 9–10 high schools in the Plano Independent School District. Jasper opened with an enrollment of 1,172 students, and a functional capacity of approximately 1,758 students.

In 2002, the Professional Development center was vacated. The area was then renovated, creating 7 classrooms and two offices, along with the enclosure of the outdoor dining area to create a dance room. The project, with a contract price of $700,157, was designed by Corgan Associates, Inc. and built by Tywell Construction Corporation. During the 2003 Bond Election held on August 23, 2003, a $3,500,000 addition of eight temporary classrooms was approved by a vote of 3,643 for to 1,499 against, in order to combat overcrowding in the school, which had reached 1,980. This was part of a $33,550,000 bond proposal of PISD.

On March 25, 2004, Big Sky Construction was chosen out of eight contractors to build an orchestra/band/choir hall. The company's proposal of $1,999,900 was more than $30,000 less expensive than the next cheapest bid to the school district. It was completed in that same year for a price of $2,000,000.

On November 28, 2005, the Plano Independent School District announced the beginning of an addition of a science wing to assist in increasing Jasper's functional capacity, as the population of the school had already exceeded 2,000 students. The addition was approved in a 2004 Facility Program Bond vote by the citizens of Plano. It was a project given to the Cadence McShane Companies, and was built along with new additions to Williams High School. The addition to Jasper was completed in July 2006, costing the school district approximately $7,501,893. Also added under the contract was a fourth cafeteria line and a multipurpose room. The wooden gym floors were redone during this same time.

Namesake
Jasper High School is named in honor of Plano banker and businessman Thomas Chilton "T.C." Jasper. Jasper was born on January 11, 1844, in Middleburg, Kentucky. He served in the Civil War in Company C, 6th Regiment Kentucky Cavalry. After the war, he returned to Kentucky and taught school. On January 8, 1874, T.C. married Mary Wilmoth Jones. The couple established a prosperous general store in nearby Mount Salem, Kentucky. Two of his children, Claude and Davie, were born there as well.

In 1887, T.C. moved his family to Plano, Texas, where his third child, Roy, was born. He quickly organized the Plano National Bank, investing out of his own pocket $40,000 of the $50,000 needed for new bank stock. The bank was chartered July 27, 1882, and T.C. served as cashier for 25 years before retiring in March 1913.

In addition to owning business properties in and around Plano, T.C. Jasper was a co-founder of the Plano Cotton Oil Company (established in 1902 and dissolved in 1916). In 1904, T.C., along with seven other men, formed the "44 Club"; its members were Confederate veterans and were all born in 1844.

He served as treasurer of the Texas Electric Railroad, was a deacon in the First Baptist Church, a Mason for 55 years (as well as a charter member of the Plano chapter), and an honorary member of the Lions Club. T.C. died in 1924 at the age of 80, after 50 years of marriage. His wife, Mary, died in 1940.

Previous Feeder Schools
Before 2009, Schimelpfenig Middle School students were zoned to go to Jasper. In 2009, Plano ISD voted that they could choose between Plano Senior High School and Plano West High School. In 2011, after a controversial debate on future overcrowding, the Plano ISD board voted that Schimelpfenig should be zoned to Plano Senior High, which meant they had to be zoned to Clark. Currently, Rice and Robinson feed to Jasper High School.

Extracurricular activities
The extracurricular activities offered at Jasper High School are many and varied due to the school's large size. There are chapters of national organizations such as the National Junior Reserve Officer Training Corps, (Leadership Education & Training); National Honor Society and clubs founded by Jasper students, such as The Effect, Jasper GSA, the Muslim Student Association (MSA), and Jasper K-Pop Dance Club. Service organizations such as the Peer Tutoring Society coexist alongside clubs where students can have fun, such as Jasper's Math Club.

Academic competition
Jasper has a prominent speech and debate team that competes up to the state level in the TFA (Texas Forensics Association), national level in the NSDA (National speech and Debate Association), and the international level in IPPF (International Public Policy Forum).

Jasper also has a competitive quizbowl club which was founded in 2018. Jasper qualified for the 2019 NAQT (National Academic Quiz Tournaments) High School National Championship Tournament and remains competitive in the circuit.

Jasper currently teaches six AP classes which are AP Calculus BC, AP Computer Science Principles, AP Environmental Science, AP European History, AP Human Geography, and AP World History. Other 5.0 courses taught include PLTW courses which are Intro to Engineering Design and Engineering Science. These classes are often taken by people looking to boost their GPA and get a high ranking percentage in Plano West Senior High. Some students take as many as four 5.0 courses in 9th grade and five in 10th grade because of the rigorous competition and cultural norms that are in their lives.

Athletics
Jasper fields 13 teams in six different sports; 7 men's teams and 6 women's teams: football (9th and 10th grades), volleyball (9th and 10th grades), basketball (9th and 10th grades), tennis (9th and 10th grades), baseball, golf and track (9th and 10th grades). Students in Marching Band receive athletic credit towards graduation, as do students in the JROTC program.

Music program
In 1996, Jasper's first year, sophomores Jessica Ridings (Edwards)  wrote the lyrics to the school song. Ridings became the Drum Major of the TCU band.

Jasper's music program is one of the most decorated in Texas. The Legacy Orchestra is consistently listed among the best in the state, ranking as one of the top five string orchestras in Texas 10 times since 2001.  In 2012-2013, the Jasper Symphony Orchestra (Legacy Orchestra and Wind Ensemble members) won the distinguished title of 2014 Texas Honor Full Orchestra, becoming the first non-varsity orchestra to ever be named Honor Orchestra in the state of Texas.

All of the music programs (band, choir, and orchestra) have many qualifiers for the All-State honor each year. Each of them also routinely earns University Interscholastic League (UIL) Sweepstakes Awards, the highest rating awarded at the annual Texas UIL large group competition.

Awards
 In October 2006, Jasper was one of eight PISD schools and 268 Texas public schools (out of 7,519, or the top 3%) to earn recognition on the Texas Business and Education Coalition Honor Roll.
 Jasper has received the 'Commended Performance' designation in English/Reading/Language Arts, Math and Science, Social Studies, and Attendance Rate.
 In 2015 Jasper Legacy Orchestra placed 1st runner up in the TMEA state convention.
 In 2019, Jasper High School was declared a National Speech and Debate Association School of Excellence in Speech.
 At the 2019 NSDA National Speech and Debate Tournament, Jasper High School students Pranav Pattatathunaduvil and Angela Wang came second and fifth, respectively, in International Extemporaneous Speaking.

References

External links 
 

Educational institutions established in 1996
High schools in Plano, Texas
Plano Independent School District high schools
1996 establishments in Texas